Eupithecia alpinata is a moth in the family Geometridae first described by Samuel E. Cassino in 1927. It is found in the US states of Texas and Arizona.

The wingspan is about 17 mm. The forewings are strongly suffused with smoky brown or gray. Adults have been recorded on wing from March to May.

References

Moths described in 1927
alpinata
Moths of North America